The Australian State Coach is an enclosed, six horse-drawn coach used by the British Royal Family. The coach was presented to Queen Elizabeth II of Australia and the United Kingdom as the official gift on the occasion of the Australian Bicentennial on 8 May 1988, and first used in November of that year at the State Opening of UK Parliament. The coach was a gift from the Australian people and was designed and built by the coach builder W. J. Frecklington who subsequently built the Diamond Jubilee State Coach for Queen Elizabeth II as a private initiative. The Australian State Coach is sometimes used at the British State Opening of Parliament and other state occasions involving the Australian or foreign royal families,  such as the visit of Queen Margrethe of Denmark in 2000. As one of the most modern of the royal coaches it is fitted with electric windows, heating and hydraulic stabilisers; it is therefore regularly used for such occasions. The Australian State Coach is usually kept at the Royal Mews, where it can be viewed by the public.

The Australian State Coach was used to convey the Prince of Wales, Duchess of Cornwall and Michael and Carole Middleton from Westminster Abbey to Buckingham Palace following the wedding of Prince William, Duke of Cambridge and Catherine Middleton on 29 April 2011.

On 5 June 2012, the Australian State Coach was, in case of rain, to be an alternative for the procession from Westminster Hall to Buckingham Palace for Queen Elizabeth II's Diamond Jubilee. However, it was decided that the weather was fit enough for the open-top 1902 State Landau to be used to carry the Queen, the Prince of Wales and the Duchess of Cornwall.

See also
State Coach (disambiguation) Other state coaches
State opening of Parliament
Royal Mews

References

External links

Australian State Coach at downau.com (with images)
Carriages at royal.gov.uk

1988 works
Australia–United Kingdom relations
British monarchy
British royal family
Royal carriages
Vehicles of the United Kingdom
Coaches (carriage)
Elizabeth II